Snowdon Ranger is a station on the narrow gauge Welsh Highland Railway, which was built in 1878 as the North Wales Narrow Gauge Railways Moel Tryfan Undertaking, to carry dressed slate to Dinas Junction on the LNWR.
The station was originally known as Quellyn Lake but was renamed after the path to the Summit of Snowdon popularised by, and named after, the local mountain guide, "The Snowdon Ranger", who went by that name for many years. Certainly the name "Snowdon Ranger" was in common use on company timetables from as early as 1879, and that of the adjacent Snowdon Ranger Hotel from at least 1869.

Passenger services ceased on 26 September, 1936, and the station was reopened in 2003 following the complete reconstruction of the railway from Waunfawr to Rhyd Ddu. The train services are operated by the Festiniog Railway Company's Welsh Highland Railway subsidiary. Snowdon Ranger is currently operated as an unmanned halt and trains call only by request.

Following reconstruction, the Section from Waunfawr to Rhyd Ddu was formally reopened by the Prince of Wales on 30 July 2003. Public passenger services re-commenced on 18 August 2003.

The former station building is now in private ownership, and as such is one of the six original remaining NWNGR buildings, the others being the ruins of the former station building at Bettws Garmon, the ruined quarry sidings office at nearby Glanrafon Sidings, the restored station buildings at Tryfan Junction and Dinas; and the goods shed at Dinas.

Notes

References

External links 

The Welsh Highland Railway Project - official reconstruction site
Welsh Highland Railway (Caernarfon)
Rebuilding The Welsh Highland Railway - an independent site
The Royal re-opening to Rhyd Ddu 2003
Welsh Highland Railway Timetables
Multimap Map of Snowdon Ranger
Video footage of Snowdon Ranger station

Heritage railway stations in Gwynedd
Welsh Highland Railway
Betws Garmon
Railway stations in Great Britain opened in 1878
Railway stations in Great Britain closed in 1936
Railway stations in Great Britain opened in 2003